Piero Tiberi (16 January 1947 – 25 October 2013) was an Italian actor and voice actor.

Biography
Born in Rome, Tiberi began his career in 1955 acting in the film Bravissimo directed by Luigi Filippo D'Amico. He then acted in six other films during his lifetime but he was more known to the Italian public as a voice dubber. He was best known for voicing Slinky Dog in the Italian version of the Toy Story film series. Tiberi also dubbed Charles Martin Smith, Dan Aykroyd, Joe Pesci and Cheech Marin in some of their films.

He was the father of actor and voice actor Alessandro Tiberi.

Death
Tiberi died on 25 October 2013 at the age of 66 after suffering a long illness.

Filmography

Cinema
Bravissimo (1955)
Hannibal (1959)
Execution Squad (1972)
The Cynic, the Rat and the Fist (1977)
From Corleone to Brooklyn (1979)
Hot Potato (1979)
Sound (1988)

Dubbing roles

Animation
Slinky Dog in Toy Story
Slinky Dog in Toy Story 2
Slinky Dog in Toy Story 3
Slinky Dog in Hawaiian Vacation
Slinky Dog in Small Fry
Tetsuya Tsurugi in Great Mazinger
Roscoe in Oliver & Company
Zalmie Belinsky in American Pop
Sylvester the Cat in Daffy Duck's Quackbusters
Rusty in Home on the Range
Principal Skinner in The Simpsons (season 1)
Andro Umeda in Tekkaman: The Space Knight
Piccolo in Dragon Ball (Dynit edition)
Ollie / Boes in Ox Tales

Live action
Elwood Blues in The Blues Brothers
Elwood Blues in Blues Brothers 2000
Beldar Conehead / Donald R. DeCicco in Coneheads
Clifford Skridlow / Doctor Detroit in Doctor Detroit
Mack Sennett in Chaplin
John Burns in The Couch Trip
Belini in Once Upon a Time in Mexico
Victor Delgado in Underclassman
Felix Gumm in Spy Kids
Felix Gumm in Spy Kids 2: The Island of Lost Dreams
Felix Gumm in Spy Kids 3-D: Game Over
Eddie Cortez in Race to Witch Mountain
Huggy Bear in Starsky & Hutch
Terry "The Toad" Fields in American Graffiti
Terry "The Toad" Fields in More American Graffiti
Michael Gold in The Big Chill
Bruce in Beyond Therapy
Joey LaMotta in Raging Bull
Gaff in Blade Runner
Luis Fernandez in Escape to Victory
Otis in Superman II
Gus Gorman in Superman III
Lothar Zogg in 3 Ninjas: High Noon at Mega Mountain
John Watson in Without a Clue
Federico Robles in Wild Rose
Ed Lasky in Falling in Love
Azro in Monkey Trouble
Hog in Goin' South
Roy Sweeney in Flesh and Bone
Woody Allen in What's Up, Tiger Lily?
Paul in Another Woman
Frank White in King of New York
Tony "Duke" Evers in Rocky III
Hikaru Sulu in Star Trek: The Motion Picture
Samuel Sutherland in The Game
Chi Chi in Scarface
Abraham "Doc" Johnson in Hamburger Hill
Andy McGee in Firestarter
Paul in Black Widow
Joseph Späh in The Hindenburg
Mac Eliot in Predator
Frost in Men at Work
Albert Crundall in Picnic at Hanging Rock
Steven Arrocas in Internal Affairs
Jefe in Three Amigos
Pete in A Clockwork Orange
John Kreese in The Karate Kid
Tyree in Silverado
Kazuo Fujita in King Kong vs. Godzilla
Jack Goodman in An American Werewolf in London
Private Drake in Aliens
Waiter in Herbie Goes to Monte Carlo
Hector Salas in The China Syndrome
Farah Aden in Out of Africa

References

External links
 
 
 

1947 births
2013 deaths
Male actors from Rome
Italian male film actors
Italian male voice actors
Italian male child actors
Italian voice directors
20th-century Italian male actors
21st-century Italian male actors